This page lists notable alumni and students of the University of California, Berkeley. Alumni who also served as faculty are listed in bold font, with degree and year.

Notable faculty members are in the article List of UC Berkeley faculty.

Astronauts
 Leroy Chiao, B.S. 1983 – astronaut, first Asian-American and ethnic Chinese person to perform a spacewalk
 F. Drew Gaffney, B.A. 1968 – astronaut
 Tamara E. Jernigan, M.S. 1985 – astronaut
 Don L. Lind, Ph.D. 1964 – astronaut
 Brian T. O'Leary, Ph.D. 1967 – astronaut
 Margaret Rhea Seddon, B.A. 1970 – astronaut
 Charles Simonyi, B.S. 1972 – fifth space tourist (also listed in section Business founders and co-founders)
 James van Hoften, B.S. 1966 – astronaut
 Rex Walheim, B.S. 1984 – astronaut, member of the "Final Four" astronauts who flew on the very last Space Shuttle flight of STS-135
 Mary Weber, Ph.D. 1988 – astronaut

Astronomers and space explorers
 William F. Ballhaus, Jr., B.S. 1967, M.S. 1968, Ph.D. 1971 – former director of NASA's Ames Research Center, president and CEO of Aerospace Corporation (also listed in "Business and entrepreneurship" section)
 Michael C. Malin, B.A. (physics) 1967 – astronomer, principal investigator for the camera on Mars Global Surveyor, MacArthur Fellow, founder and CEO of Malin Space Science Systems, recipient of a NASA Exceptional Scientific Achievement Medal in 2002, recipient of the 2005 Carl Sagan Memorial Award
 Gerry Nelson, Ph.D 1972 – inventor of the segmented mirror telescope, for which he was awarded the Kavli Prize, leading to the building of the Keck telescopes
 Roger J. Phillips, Ph.D. 1968 – team leader of Apollo 17 Lunar Sounder Experiment, former director of Lunar and Planetary Institute and recipient of the G K Gilbert Award and the Whipple Award.
 H. Paul Shuch, Ph.D. 1990 – SETI scientist
 Peter Smith, B.S. 1969 – principal investigator and project leader for the $420 million NASA robotic explorer Phoenix, which physically confirmed the presence of water on the planet Mars for the first time
 David J. Schlegel, Ph.D. 1995 – pioneered the largest dust maps of the Universe, used to map the expansion rate of the Universe to more than 10 billion light years, recipient of the Lawrence Award
 Joel Stebbins, Ph.D. Physics 1903 – pioneered photoelectric photometry in astronomy, Royal Astronomical Society Gold Medal (1950), Henry Draper Medal (1915), Rumford Prize (1913), namesake of asteroid 2300 Stebbins and the moon crater Stebbins
 Charles Bruce Stephenson, Ph.D. 1958 – astronomer
 Jean L. Turner, Ph.D. – professor of Astronomy and Physics at UCLA
 Theodore Van Zelst, B.S. 1944 – co-founder of Soiltest (testing company for soil, rock, concrete, and asphalt), recipient of the 1988 ASCE's "Chicago Engineer of the Year" award, developed the swing-wing design that allows supersonic aircraft to exceed the sound barrier, developed the first mobile baggage inspection unit, and developed lunar construction and soil testing for humankind's first steps on the moon
 Martha Stahr Carpenter, Ph.D. 1945 – Astronomer, three term president of AAVSO, and first women faculty member in the Cornell University College of Arts and Sciences.

Biologists
David E. Garfin, Ph.D. – biophysicist who has made significant contributions to electrophoresis in both the engineering and biology communities
Kathy Hudson, Ph.D. – Microbiologist specializing in science policy
Edmund C. Jaeger – graduate student in 1918, became a renowned naturalist
Lidia Mannuzzu, Ph.D. 1990 – biologist and physiologist, inventor of the biomolecular optical sensors with Ehud Y. Isacoff and Mario Moronne
 Constance Tom Noguchi, biophysicist, Chief of the Molecular Cell Biology Section at National Institute of Diabetes and Digestive and Kidney Diseases (NIDDK)
Donald W. Roberts, Ph.D. 1964  Research Professor Emeritus at Utah State University, early contributor to the idea of biological pest control
Howard Schachman, professor of biochem and molecular biology
Gopalan Shyamala, conducted cancer and zoology research; mother of California U.S. Senator and American Vice President-elect, Kamala Harris

Computer scientists and engineers

 Allan Alcorn, 1971 – employee #3 at video game company Atari, electronics designer behind Atari's seminal Pong video arcade unit, and erstwhile boss of Steve Jobs at Atari
 Giovanni De Micheli, M.S. EECS 1980, Ph.D. EECS 1983 - pioneer of Network on a chip; Fellow of ACM and IEEE and a member of the Academia Europaea
 Eric Allman, B.S. EECS 1977, M.S. C.S. 1980  – creator of Sendmail (mail transfer agent which delivers 70% of the email in the world); inducted into the Internet Hall of Fame
 Ken Arnold, B.A. CS 1985 – creator of the Curses software library, co-creator of Rogue
 Richard O. Buckius, Bachelor's '72 in Mechanical Engineering, Masters '73, Ph.D. '75 – Chief Operating Officer of the National Science Foundation
 David Chaum, Ph.D. CS 1982 – creator of the company DigiCash and the first digital currency, eCash
 Wen-Tsuen Chen, Ph.D. 1976 – helped establish the Taiwan Academic Network (TANet), the first Internet in Taiwan; winner of the 2011 Taylor L. Booth Education Award (also listed in Chancellors and Presidents) 
 Wesley A. Clark, B.S. Physics 1947 – designed the first modern personal computer (LINC)
 George Crow, B.S. EE 1966 – one of the original computer hardware designers of the Apple Macintosh computer
 Alyosha Efros, Ph.D. 2003 – computer vision researcher and winner of the 2017 ACM Prize in Computing
 Katherine Faber, Ph.D. 1982 – professor of materials science at the California Institute of Technology, expert in the study of mechanical behavior and material strengthening
 Sally Floyd. B.S. 1971, Ph.D. 1989 – invented Random Early Detection, or RED, an algorithm widely used in the internet. 
Andrea Frome, Ph.D. 2007 – known in the fields of computer vision, deep learning, and machine learning.
 John Gage, B.S. 1975 – fifth employee of Sun Microsystems, former chief researcher and vice-president of the Science Office for Sun Microsystems, current partner at venture capital firm Kleiner Perkins with Al Gore; credited with creating the phrase "the network is the computer"
 Gary Grossman, B.A. CS – software engineer, the "inventor of ActionScript" (the programming language utilized by Web content authors using the Adobe Flash Player platform)
 Jean Paul Jacob, M.S. and Ph.D. in Mathematics and Engineering (1966) – long research manager at the Almaden IBM Research Center, California; recipient of the University of California Research Leadership Award in 2003 for his 40 years of work and research development in its departments; electronic engineering degree (1960) from the Brazilian ITA
 Eugene Jarvis, B.S. EECS 1976 – creator of the classic Defender video arcade game; recipient of the Academy of Interactive Arts and Sciences Pioneer Award 
 Lynne Greer Jolitz, B.A. 1989 – co-author, with husband William Jolitz, of 386BSD, which is the ancestor of FreeBSD, which in turn is an ancestor of Apple's Darwin operating system
 William Jolitz, B.A. 1997 – co-author, with wife Lynne Greer Jolitz, of 386BSD
 Spencer Kimball, B.A. CS 1996 – creator of the GIMP software
 Phil Lapsley, B.S. EECS 1988, M.S. EECS 1991 – co-creator of the NNTP (Network News Transfer Protocol used by Usenet newsgroups)
 Anthony Levandowski, B.S. Industrial Engineering 2002, M.S. IEOR 2003 – product manager of the Google driverless car; inventor of robotic motorcycle "Ghostrider" featured at the Smithsonian Institution, software developer at Google serving on the inaugural StreetView team
 Ed Logg, B.A. C.S. – engineering creator of the classic video games Asteroids, Centipede, and Gauntlet at Atari; recipient of the Academy of Interactive Arts and Sciences Pioneer Award
 Gordon Eugene Martin, B.S. EE 1947 – pioneering piezoelectric materials researcher for underwater sound transducers
John M. Martinis, B.S., Ph.D. – first to achieve quantum supremacy
 Peter Mattis, B.S. CS 1997 – creator of GTK software
 Jack McCauley, B.S. EE and C.S. 1986  –  engineer, inventor and video game developer
 Peter Merholz, B.A. 1993 – coined the term "blog"
 Ralph Merkle, B.A. 1974, M.S. 1977 – pioneer in public-key cryptography computer algorithms
 Jay Miner, 1959 – inventor of the Amiga personal computer
Larry Nagel, BS 1969, MS 1970, PhD 1975 – IEEE Donald O. Pederson Award in Solid-State Circuits for "the development and demonstration of SPICE as a tool to design and optimize electronic circuits."
 Hans Reiser, B.A. 1992 – creator of the ReiserFS and Reiser4 computer filesystems
 Lucy Suchman, B.A. 1972, M.A. 1977, Ph.D. 1984 – Professor of Sociology, Lancaster University (UK); former research anthropologist at Xerox PARC and pioneer of human-computer interaction studies; author of Plans and Situated Actions (1987); awarded 2002 Benjamin Franklin Medal in Computer and Cognitive Science
 Andrew Tanenbaum, Ph.D. 1971 – computer scientist and creator of Minix, the precursor to Linux
 Ken Thompson, B.S., 1965; M.S., 1966 – Turing Award winner who designed and implemented the original Unix operating system
 Murray Turoff, B.A. Math and Physics 1958 – recipient of the Electronic Frontier Foundation's EFF Pioneer Award in 1994 for "significant and influential contributions to computer-based communications and to the empowerment of individuals in using computers"; distinguished professor emeritus at the New Jersey Institute of Technology
 David Wagner, M.S. 1999, Ph.D. 2000 – Professor of Computer Science; known for research in cryptography and security generally, including electronic voting
 Laurel van der Wal, B.S. 1949 – bioastronautics researcher
 William Yeager, B.A. 1964 – software developer who created the first multiple-protocol router software, which comprised the core of the first Cisco Systems IOS
 Ian A. Young, Ph.D. 1978 – senior fellow of Intel; co-inventor of Intel BiCMOS logic circuit family and clock design of Pentium series microprocessors from 50 MHz to 3 GHz

Enrico Fermi Award
 John N. Bahcall, B.A. 1956 – 2003 Enrico Fermi Award for "innovative research in astrophysics leading to a revolution in understanding the properties of the elusive neutrino, the lightest known particle with mass."
 John S. Foster, Jr., Ph.D. 1952 – 1992 Enrico Fermi Award for "his outstanding contributions to national security, in technical leadership in the development of nuclear weapons, in leadership of Lawrence Livermore National Laboratory in its formative years, in technical leadership in the defense industry; and for excellent service and continued counsel to the government."
 M. Stanley Livingston, Ph.D. 1931 – 1986 Enrico Fermi Award for "his leadership contributions to the development of nuclear accelerators over a half century, from his involvement in the designing of the first cyclotrons to his role in the discovery of strong (alternating gradient) focusing, now used throughout the world for the design of nuclear accelerators and particle beams of the highest energies."
 Glenn T. Seaborg, Ph.D. 1937 – 1959 Enrico Fermi Award for "discoveries of plutonium and several additional elements and for leadership in the development of nuclear chemistry and atomic energy."
 Charles Shank, B.S. 1965, M.S. 1966, Ph.D. 1969–  director (1989-2004) of the Lawrence Berkeley National Laboratory and professor (1989-2004) of chemistry, physics, and EE CS; 2015 Fermi Award for  “the seminal development of ultrafast lasers and their application in many areas of scientific research, for visionary leadership of national scientific and engineering research communities, and for exemplary service supporting the National Laboratory complex.”,
 Stafford L. Warren, B.A. 1918 – pioneer in nuclear medicine; first dean of the School of Medicine at UCLA; 1971 Enrico Fermi Award for "the imaginative, prescient, and vigorous efforts which made possible the early development of atomic energy so as to assure the protection of man and the environment, and for the establishment of a biomedical research program which has resulted in many substantial applications of ionizing radiation to diagnosis and treatment of disease and to the general welfare."
 Robert R. Wilson, B.A. 1936, Ph.D. 1940 – 1973 National Medal of Science, 1984 Enrico Fermi Award for "his outstanding contributions to physics and particle accelerator designs and construction. He was the creator and principal designer of the Fermi National Laboratory and what is, at present, the highest energy accelerator in the world. His contributions have always been characterized by the greatest ingenuity and innovation and accomplished with grace and style."
 Herbert York, Ph.D. 1949 – 2000 Enrico Fermi Award for "his contributions to formulating and implementing arms control policy under four Presidents; for his founding direction of the Lawrence Livermore National Laboratory and his leadership in Research and Engineering at the Department of Defense; and for his publications analyzing and explaining these complex issues with clarity and simplicity."

Feynman Prize
The Feynman Prize in Nanotechnology is awarded by the Foresight Institute for significant advancements in nanotechnology. The prize is named in honor of Nobel physicist Richard Feynman, whose 1959 talk '"There's Plenty of Room at the Bottom" is considered to have inspired the beginning of the field of nanotechnology.

 David Baker, Ph.D. 1989 – biochemist and computation biologist, professor at the University of Washington, known for protein structure prediction distributed computing project Rosetta@home  and the video game Foldit, recipient of the 2004 Feynman Prize
 Marvin L. Cohen, B.A. Physics 1957 –  professor of Physics at UC Berkeley, 2003 Feynman Prize
 Steven Gwon Sheng Louie, Ph.D. 1976 – computational condensed-matter physicist, professor of Physics at UC Berkeley, 2003 Feynman Prize
 Alex Zettl, B.A. 1978 – Professor of Condensed Matter Physics and Materials Science at UC Berkeley, Senior Scientist, Material Sciences Division, Lawrence Berkeley National Laboratory, recipient of the 2013 Feynman Prize

Mathematicians and physicists

 David Bohm, Ph.D. 1943 – founded pilot-wave theory of quantum mechanics, also known as Bohmian mechanics
 Edward Condon, Ph.D. 1926 – pioneer in quantum physics, director of the National Bureau of Standards, president of the American Physical Society
 Marc Culler Ph.D. 1978 – mathematician working in geometric group theory and low-dimensional topology
 George Dantzig, Ph.D. 1946 – father of linear programming, created the simplex algorithm
 Andreas Floer, mathematician, inventor of Floer homology
 Albert Ghiorso, B.S. EE 1937 – co-discoverer of twelve chemical elements such as americium, berkelium, and californium
 Edward Ginzton, B.S. 1936, M.S. 1937 –  recipient of the 1969 IEEE Medal of Honor, namesake of the Ginzton Laboratory at Stanford University
 Michio Kaku, Ph.D. 1972 – theoretical physicist, co-creator of string field theory, author of the New York Times bestsellers Hyperspace and Physics of the Impossible, radio host of  Science Fantastic
 Joseph W. Kennedy, Ph.D. 1939 – codiscoverer of the element plutonium; later, professor and head of the department of chemistry at Washington University in St. Louis
 Arthur Scott King, Ph.D. 1903 – first ever Ph.D. in physics from this university
 Robyn Millan, B.A. 1995, M.A. 1999, Ph.D. 2002 – experimental physicist known for work on Earth's radiation belts
 John H. Schwarz, Ph.D. 1966 – theoretical physicist, one of the founders of superstring theory

Physicians and Allied Medical Specialists
Zubin Damania (born 1973), physician, comedian, internet personality, musician, and founder of Turntable Health
Madhu Pai, PhD in epidemiology at University of California, Berkeley, is the Canada Research Chair of Epidemiology and Global Health at McGill University.
 Helen B. Taussig, B.A. 1921 – cardiologist,   namesake of Blalock–Taussig shunt for blue baby syndrome; recipient of 1964 Medal of Freedom from President Lyndon Johnson; first female president of the American Heart Association; namesake of the "Helen B. Taussig Children's Pediatric Cardiac Center" at Johns Hopkins University; namesake of the Helen B. Taussig College at the Johns Hopkins University School of Medicine

Other
 Hal Anger, B.S. 1943 – inventor of the scintillation camera (known as the Anger camera), pioneer in nuclear medicine
 Mary Kalin Arroyo, Ph.D. 1971 in Botany – professor, University of Chile
 Arlene Blum, Ph.D. 1971 in Chemistry – Executive Director of the Green Science Policy Institute, author,  mountaineer who lead an all-woman ascent of Annapurna
 Michael J. Carey, B.S. 1983 – technical director at BEA Systems, member of the National Academy of Engineering
 Alan H. Coogan, M.A. 1957 – geologist specializing in applied sedimentary geology
 Richard M. Eakin, B.A. 1931, Ph.D. 1935 – Professor of Zoology, known for lecturing dressed as famous scientists
 Glen Edwards, B.S. 1941 – U.S. Air Force test pilot, namesake of Edwards Air Force Base
 Lillian Moller Gilbreth, B.A. 1900, M.A. 1902 – industrial/organizational psychologist along with her husband Frank Bunker Gilbreth who researched industrial worker efficiency; first woman member of the American Society of Mechanical Engineers; she and her husband were the basis of the books Cheaper by the Dozen and Belles on Their Toes, which were written by their children; commemorated on a United States Postal Service stamp in 1984; portrayed by Myrna Loy in the 1950 film Cheaper by the Dozen
 Maurice K. Goddard, M.S. 1938 – former secretary of the Pennsylvania Department of Conservation and Natural Resources, a driving force in the creation of 45 Pennsylvania state parks during his 24 years in office
 Charles Scott Haley, B.S. 1907 – was an expert in the field of placer gold deposits.
 Charles F. Harbison, B.A. 1933 – entomologist and the curator of entomology at the San Diego Natural History Museum
 Denham Harman, B.S. Chemistry, M.S. Chemistry, Ph.D. Chemistry 1943 – father of the free-radical theory of aging
 Dorothy M. Horstmann B.S. 1936 – virologist who made important discoveries about polio
 Susan Hough, B.A. 1982 – seismologist and author
 Harvey Itano, B.S. 1942 – professor of pathology at the University of California, San Diego, first Japanese American elected to the National Academy of Sciences, and pioneering researcher in sickle cell anemia
 Hope Jahren, Ph.D. 1996 in soil science – geobotanist and geochemist
 Richard F. Johnston – ornithologist, academic and author
 David Julius, Ph.D. 1984 – awarded Breakthrough Prize for discovering molecules, cells, and mechanisms underlying pain sensation
 Greg Kasavin – video game developer and former editor of GameSpot
 Ancel Keys, B.A. 1925, M.S. 1928, Ph.D. 1930 – originator of the low fat diet for cardiovascular disease, and the Keys Equation
 John Augustus Larson, Ph.D. 1920 – inventor of the modern lie detector
 Jane McGonigal, M.A., 2003, Ph.D. 2006 in performance studies – game designer and games researcher; named one of the world's top innovators under the age of 35 by MIT's Technology Review in 2006
 Margaret Melhase, B.S. – co-discoverer of Caesium-137
Anna María Nápoles, M.P.H., Ph.D. – behavioral epidemiologist and science administrator
 Roger Revelle, Ph.D. 1936 – one of the "grandfathers" (with Hans Suess) of the global warming hypothesis (but later wrote "the scientific base for a greenhouse warming is too uncertain to justify drastic action at this time"), "father" of the University of California, San Diego; founder of the Center for Population Studies at Harvard University where he mentored undergraduate Al Gore
 Loren L. Ryder, B.S. Physics 1924 – invented the use of magnetic tape in the sound of films, recipient of five Academy Awards for his technical expertise
 Zdenka Samish, M.A. 1933 – Czech-Israeli food technology researcher; one of first agricultural researchers in pre-state Israel
 Carol Shaw, B.S. Engineering, M.A. C.S. – first woman video game designer
 Milicent Shinn, Ph.D. 1898 – child psychologist and author, first woman to earn a doctorate at Berkeley
 Tiffany Shlain, B.A. 1992 – founder of Webby Awards, filmmaker
 Simon Schwartzman, Ph.D. 1973 – recipient of the Brazilian Order of Scientific Merit
 Oktay Sinanoğlu, B.S. 1956 – the "Turkish Einstein"; professor of chemistry and molecular biophysics and biochemistry at Yale University
 Tracy I. Storer, B.S. 1912, M.S. 1913, Ph.D. 1921 – zoologist specializing in California wildlife, founded Department of Zoology at U.C. Davis
 Keith Tantlinger, B.S. 1941 – mechanical engineer, developer of the modern intermodal container (including the twistlock) 
 Jenny Y. Yang, B.S. 2001 – chemist
 Cher Wang, co-founder of VIA Technologies and HTC, and a pioneer of the smartphone.

 Gardner F. Williams, B.A. 1865, M.A. 1869 (first master's degree conferred by "College of California", aka UC/Berkeley) – first general manager of De Beers Consolidated Mines;  mining engineer; wrote The Diamond Mines of South Africa; some account of their rise and development; awarded silver medal by the Royal Academy of Science in Sweden in 1905; awarded honorary doctorate of laws by the University of California in 1910

See also
 List of UC Berkeley faculty
 University of California, Berkeley School of Law

References

Berkeley alumni in science and technology
Alumni Science